With or WITH may refer to:

 With, a preposition in English
 Carl Johannes With (1877–1923), Danish doctor and arachnologist
 With (character), a character in D. N. Angel
 With (novel), a novel by Donald Harrington
 With (album), a 2014 album by TVXQ
 With (EP), a 2021 EP by Nam Woo-hyun

Radio stations
 WITH (FM), a radio station (90.1 FM) licensed to Ithaca, New York, United States
 WRBS (AM), a radio station (1230 AM) licensed to Baltimore, Maryland, United States, which used the call sign WITH from 1941 until 2006
 WZFT, a radio station (104.3 FM) licensed to Baltimore, Maryland, United States, which used the call sign WITH-FM from 1949 until 1974

Places
 Woodlands Integrated Transport Hub, a bus interchange located in Woodlands, Singapore.